Syed Kalbe Hussain Naqvi (मौलाना सैय्यद कल्बे हुसैन नक़वी) (مولانا سيد كلب حسين نقوى), also known as "Kabban", was a Twelver Shia muslim cleric, scholar, preacher and a mujtahid from Lucknow, India.

Career
He was a prominent cleric, and was chief of the Shia scholars of the South Asia during his time.

Family
He came from a family of scholars, known as "Khandan-e-Ijtehad" (Ijtihadi family), originally form Nasirabad-Jais, Raibareli, India, of whose Syed Dildar Ali Nasirabadi also known as Ghufran Ma'ab was a patriarch. Syed Hasan Naqvi Aqa Hasan was Kalbe Hussain's father.

Hussain's sons include Syed Kalbe Abid and Syed Kalbe Sadiq. His son Kalbe Sadiq is known for his efforts to spread modern education among Muslims. His grandson, Syed Kalbe Jawad (son of Syed Kalbe Abid) is a cleric and a Friday prayer leader of the Asifi Masjid in Lucknow, India.

Works
 Duniya Ka Sarveshesth Hasti
 Gharze Shahadat

Reference

Further reading

Indian Shia clerics
Ijtihadi family
Scholars from Lucknow
Indian people of Arab descent